USS Dextrous (MCM-13) is an  mine countermeasures ship in the United States Navy.

She was built by Peterson Shipbuilders, Sturgeon Bay, Wisconsin. Dextrous is homeported in Bahrain and is part of the U.S. Fifth Fleet.

References
Official USS Dextrous (MCM-13)  webpage

 

Avenger-class mine countermeasures ships
Minehunters of the United States
1992 ships
Ships built by Peterson Builders